|}

The Park Express Stakes is a Group 3 flat horse race in Ireland open to thoroughbred fillies and mares aged three years or older. It is run over a distance of 1 mile (1,609 metres) at the Curragh in March.

History
The event is named after Park Express, a successful Irish-trained filly in the 1980s. It was established in 2003, and initially held Listed status. The first running was won by Wrong Key. It was promoted to Group 3 level in 2006.

The Park Express Stakes is currently Ireland's first Group race of the year.

Records
Most successful horse:
 no horse has won this race more than once

Leading jockey (4 wins):
 Wayne Lordan – Danehill Music (2006), Lolly for Dolly (2011), Chrysanthemum (2012), Epona Plays (2021)

Leading trainer (4 wins):
 Jim Bolger – Alexander Goldrun (2004), Oh Goodness Me (2009), Rehn's Nest (2013), Normandel (2019)

Winners

See also
 Horse racing in Ireland
 List of Irish flat horse races

References
 Racing Post:
 galopp-sieger.de – Park Express Stakes.
 ifhaonline.org – International Federation of Horseracing Authorities – Park Express Stakes (2020).
 pedigreequery.com – Park Express Stakes – Curragh.

Mile category horse races for fillies and mares
Curragh Racecourse
Flat races in Ireland
2003 establishments in Ireland
Recurring sporting events established in 2003